Leopold the Cat (Kot Leopold) is a Soviet/Russian animated short film series about a good-natured and prudent cat, Leopold. Leopold always wears a bow tie even when swimming. Throughout the series, he has to deal with two mischievous mice, Grey and White (Mitya and Motya according to an early script version, but the cartoons themselves mention no names). The animation was produced at T/O Ekran in 1975 - 1987 and its runtime is 87 min (10 episodes). As of 1987, there were 11 episodes in total. Eventually, in 1995, most of the episodes were released on DVD.

It was directed by Anatoly Reznikov, and the screenplay was written by Arkady Khait. Boris Savelyev wrote the score. The cinematography was by Ernst Gaman (1975, 1982), Igor Shkamarda (1975, 1981, 1983), and Vladimir Milovanov (1981, 1983, 1984, 1986). Nelli Kudrina did the sound. The character's unusual name came from the antagonist of the movie The New Adventures of the Elusive Avengers named Colonel Leopold Sergeyevich Kudasov.

Leopold's catchphrase is "Guys, let's all get along". The catchphrases of the two mice are "Come out, Leopold!" by the one and "Come out, you foul coward!" by the second.

Voice cast 
 Andrei Mironov voiced all characters in episodes 1 and 8
 Gennady Khazanov voiced all characters in episode 2
 Alexander Kalyagin voiced all characters in episodes 3-7 and 9-11

Episodes 
 1975 — Leopold Cat's Revenge / Месть кота Леопольда
 1975 — Leopold and the Golden Fish / Леопольд и золотая рыбка
 1981 — Cat Leopold's Treasure / Клад кота Леопольда
 1981 — Leopold's TV / Телевизор кота Леопольда
 1982 — Leopold Goes for a Walk / Прогулка кота Леопольда
 1982 — Birthday of Leopold the Cat / День рождения кота Леопольда
 1983 — Leopold's Summer / Лето кота Леопольда
 1984 — Interview with Leopold the Cat / Интервью с котом Лепольдом
 1984 — Leopold the Cat in a Dream and in Reality / Кот Леопольд во сне и наяву
 1986 — Leopold the Cat's Polyclinic / Поликлиника кота Леопольда
 1987 — Leopold's Automobile / Автомобиль кота Леопольда

See also 
Leopold Mozart, the most common cultural reference in history for Russians

References

External links 

Leopold the Cat at Animator.ru

1975 animated films
1975 films
1981 animated films
1981 films
1982 animated films
1982 films
1983 animated films
1983 films
1984 animated films
1984 films
1986 animated films
1986 films
1987 animated films
1987 films
2015 animated films
2015 films
Soviet animated films
Studio Ekran films
Short film series
Russian animated short films